Aiouea parvissima  is a plant species in the family Lauraceae. It is endemic to Guatemala where it has only been found in the departments of Petén and Izabal. It is a tree or shrub of up to 7 m that grows in secondary broadleaf forest in association with Manilkara species.

References

parvissima
Endemic flora of Guatemala
Trees of Guatemala
Petén–Veracruz moist forests
parvissima